Ramayapalem is a village in Peda Araveedu Mandal in Prakasam district of Andhra Pradesh state, India. It belongs to Andhra region. It is located  towards west from District headquarters Ongole.  from State capital Hyderabad.

Ramayapalem Pin code is 523331 and postal head office is Pedda Dornala.

Ramayapalem is surrounded by Markapur Mandal towards South, Tarlupadu Mandal towards South, Dornala Mandal towards west, Donakonda Mandal towards East.

Markapur, Srisailam Project (Right Flank Colony) Township, Vinukonda, Macherla are the nearby Cities to Ramayapalem.

References 

Villages in Prakasam district